Westbury Park may refer to:

Westbury Park, Bristol

See also
Westbury (disambiguation)